Punaram Nishad, born in Ringni, Dist Durg Chhattisgarh, is an Indian folk musician, known for his prowess in the Pandavani, a folk music tradition of Chhattisgarh and the neighbouring states in India. Born in the Indian state of Chhattisgarh, (then Madhya Pradesh) to a Bhajan singer, he started learning the art from the age of 10 under Jhadu Ram Dewangan, considered by many as the father of Pandvani, and aligned with the Vedamati tradition of Pandavani, which follows a rigid text, and does not permit improvisations.

Nishad has composed 18 stories for Pandavani, of which Udyog Parv is his favourite. He has acted in two plays, Agra Bazaar directed by Habib Tanvir, and a Naya Theatre production, Duryodhan. His performance has been staged during the Beyond the Border Festival Tour at Phoenix Arts Centre, Leicester on 28 June 1995. The Government of India awarded him the fourth highest civilian honour of the Padma Shri, in 2005, for his contributions to Indian fork arts. He lives in Ringni village of Durg district in Chhattisgarh and continues to teach Pandavani at his residence, Shanti Niketan Ashram. His son, Rohit Nishad, is a farmer.

See also 
 Pandavani
 Teejan Bai

References

External links 
 

Recipients of the Padma Shri in arts
Musicians from Chhattisgarh
Indian folk musicians
Indian male stage actors
People from Durg district
Living people
1939 births
20th-century Indian composers
Male actors from Chhattisgarh
20th-century Indian male actors